The southern yellow white-eye (Zosterops anderssoni) is a bird species in the family Zosteropidae. It is found in parts of southern Africa. It was formerly considered conspecific with the African yellow white-eye.

The southern yellow white-eye was formerly treated as a subspecies of the African yellow white-eye, (renamed the northern yellow white-eye), (Zosterops senegalensis) but it is now considered as a separate species based on the phylogenetic relationships determined in a molecular study in 2013.

Three subspecies are recognised:
 Z. a. anderssoni Shelley, 1892 – east and south Angola and north Namibia to southwest Tanzania, west Mozambique and north South Africa
 Z. a. tongensis Roberts, 1931 – southeast Zimbabwe, south Mozambique and northeast South Africa
 Z. a. stierlingi Reichenow, 1899 – east and south Tanzania, east Zambia, Malawi and north Mozambique

References

Zosterops
Birds described in 1892